Georgina Elaine Cates (born Clare Elaine Woodgate; 14 January 1975) is an English film and television actress.

Life and career
Born Clare  Elaine Woodgate in Colchester, Essex, Cates attended Colchester County High School for Girls and broke into television acting when she was 16 years old, playing the role of Jenny Porter on the BBC's 2point4 Children. After two series, she left the show to concentrate on acting in television dramas such as Casualty and The Bill and in low-budget films.

In 1995, Cates (then still known as Clare Woodgate) auditioned for the role of Stella in the film An Awfully Big Adventure but was not cast. On returning home, she dyed her hair red and reinvented herself as a 17-year-old Liverpudlian girl called Georgina Cates who had no previous acting experience. When she re-applied for the same role, the casting director hired her. She went on to appear in such films as Frankie Starlight (1995), Illuminata (1998), and A Soldier's Sweetheart (1998). She received critical acclaim for her role as Amanda in Clay Pigeons (1998) with Vince Vaughn and Joaquin Phoenix. After a seven-year break from the movie industry, Cates returned to the independent film genre to co-star in Sinner, for which she won a Best Actress award at the Brooklyn Arts Council International Film & Video Festival.

Personal life
In 1997, Cates married her second husband, American actor Skeet Ulrich, with whom she had twins. The couple separated in 2004 and divorced in 2005, citing irreconcilable differences.

Awards
Best Actress in a Leading Role, Sinner, 41st Annual Brooklyn Arts Council International Film & Video Festival
Actress of the Year (Nominee), An Awfully Big Adventure,  1996 London Critics Circle Film Awards

Filmography

References

1975 births
English film actresses
English television actresses
Living people
People from Colchester
People educated at Colchester County High School